The Somali Outlaws are a Somali American gang. The gang originated in the Minneapolis–Saint Paul metropolitan area.

History 
The Somali Outlaws is a street gang consisting  of Somali American youths. Mustafa Ali, the leader of the Outlaws, was shot three times in the chest and killed on October 11, 2019.

Territory 
The Outlaws' principal territory encompasses the area around the Karmel Mall in south Minneapolis,  and in Saint Paul, Minnesota. They are also located in the Cedar-Riverside neighborhood, which has a high concentration of Somali-Americans and Somali immigrants.

Rival gangs 
The Outlaws' main rivals are Hot Boyz, Madhiban With Attitude, and 1627 Boys, a gang named after a high-rise apartment building in Cedar-Riverside. A shooting on one gang's turf can be followed hours, and sometimes minutes later, by a shooting in a rival gang's area.

References 

African-American gangs
Gangs in Minnesota
Gangs in Ohio
Gangs in Tennessee